Nashville Children's Theatre (NCT) is one of the oldest continually operating professional children's theatre company in America. It is a member of the Theatre for Young Audiences, the ASSITEJ, and is affiliated with the Actors' Equity Association.

History
NCT was established in 1931 by the Junior League of Nashville. Originally called The Nashville Academy Theatre, it opened with the production of "Aladdin and His Wonderful Lamp." NCT has performed at Belcourt Theatre, Vanderbilt University and Belmont University. 

TIME Magazine ranked NCT as one of the top five children's theatres in the country.

Awards

Affiliations

References

External links 
 www.nashvillechildrenstheatre.org

Children's theatre
Culture of Nashville, Tennessee
Organizations based in Nashville, Tennessee
Performing arts education in the United States
Theatre companies in Tennessee
Tourist attractions in Nashville, Tennessee